Harry Halifax Hayford is Ghanaian politician and a lawyer. He was a member of the 3rd parliament of the 4th republic of Ghana and a member of parliament for the Abura- Asebu-Kwamankese constituency of the Central Region of Ghana.

Early life and career 
Hayford, who hails from the Central Region of Ghana is a Lawyer by profession. He became a politician and in the year 2000, he contested for the member of parliament seat in the Abura- Asebu-Kwamankese constituency of the Central Region of Ghana where he stood for the position during the 2000 Ghanaian general elections won.

Politics 
Hayford is a politician and a member of the National Democratic Congress. He became a member of the third parliament of the fourth republic of Ghana on the ticket of the National Democratic Congress where he was a representative of the Asebu-Kwamankese constituency of the Central Region of Ghana. His political career began when he contested in the 2000 Ghanaian general elections and won a seat for the National Democratic Congress with a total vote of 13,661 representing 44.90% of the total votes cast over his opponents Andrew Kingsford Mensah of the New Patriotic Party, Raymond Nonnatus Osei of the Convention People's Party who polled 2,570% which represent 8.40% of the total votes, Joshua Alfred Amuah of the National Reform Party who had 1,093 representing 3.60% of the total votes cast, Ametorwo Richard Korbla of the People's National Convention who also polled 321 votes representing 1.10% of the total votes cast and Yeboah Peter of the United Ghana Movement polling 263 representing 0.90% of the total votes cast. His term in office ended in 2004 when he lost to Augustine Solomon Ekye during the delegate election of the region.

References 

Living people
Year of birth missing (living people)
20th-century Ghanaian lawyers
National Democratic Congress (Ghana) politicians
People from Ashanti Region